Bruno Maïorana (born 23 December 1966) is a French cartoonist and illustrator who quit the comics industry in 2014, at the height of his popularity.

Biography 
After high school Bruno Maïorana enrolled in the fine art school in Angoulême,  where he met future collaborators Alain Ayroles and Thierry Leprévost, to major in comic art. However, Maïorana dropped-out before graduation to work as an illustrator at animation studio IDDH, where Ayroles, Jean-Luc Masbou and Leprévost would also work for a time. Maïorana's first graphic novel project, Garulfo, was based on Ayroles idea to turn a classic fairy tale on its head. Originally, Ayroles intended to illustrate the story himself, however, editors advised him to find someone to collaborate with as the draft boards he had presented to them did not meet approval. After Ayroles had approached Maïorana for his collaboration, Guy Delcourt (editor) agreed to publish the series which ran from 1995 to 2002. The series proved a commercial and critical success but ended after only six albums.
By 2014, the series had sold around 300,000 copies.

Maïorana's second, and final, graphic novel project began in 2009 when he teamed up with Alain Ayroles once more to illustrate D, a gothic tale of Vampires in Victorian London, published by Guy Delcourt (editor)

Despite the success of both series and having shared his concerns over the future of the trade with fans, he announced in 2014 via his Facebook page that he was quitting the comics industry for good. The reason for this high-profile departure Maïorana put down to the deadline-driven system of remuneration, whereby each page or board has to be delivered with a certain timeframe, regardless of the amount of work it might require. He now specialises on "pure" illustration, working in black pen on white

Bibliography

Garulfo 
Written by Alain Ayroles, colors by Thierry Leprévost.
1 
2 
3 
4 
5 
6

D 
Illustrated by Alain Ayroles, colors by Thierry Leprévost
1 
2 
3

Artbooks

References

External links 
Garulfo on Delcourt's website
Garulfo on BeDeTheque.com
Bruno Maïorana on Instagram
Bruno Maïorana at the Daniel Maghen Gallery, Paris

Bruno Maïorana 

French comics artists
French comics
1966 births
Living people